Yakawlang (also romanized as Yakaolang) was a city of 65,000 people (est. 2000) in Yakawlang District, Bamyan Province, Afghanistan. It was significantly destroyed by military forces in 2000–2001.

History
Yakawlang was captured from the Taliban by the United Front forces (Hezbe Wahdat and Harakat Islami) on 28 December 2000, but was recaptured by the Taliban in early January 2001. Following its recapture, there were reports of mass arrests and summary executions carried out from 8–12 January 2001. A number of aid agency personnel and a United Nations staff member were among those who were killed.

Climate
 

Yakawlang experiences a warm-summer humid continental climate (Dsb) under the Köppen climate classification, with warm, dry summers and cold, snowy winters.

See also
 Yakawlang District
 Bamyan Province

Notes

Populated places in Bamyan Province
Bamyan Province
Hazarajat